Ostrhauderfehn is a municipality in the Leer district of Lower Saxony, Germany.

It split from Rhauderfehn sometime between 1820 and 1830.  Ostrhauderfehn was for many years one of the largest municipalities in the district of Leer.

References

Towns and villages in East Frisia
Leer (district)